Asti is the name of a Thracian tribe which is mentioned by Livy. It is believed that they lived around the old Thracian capital of Bizye.

List of rulers
A possible continuation of the earlier Odrysian monarchy under a line of kings reigning from Bizye (now Vize) in eastern Thrace. 
 Cotys V, son of ? Beithys (?-by 87 BC)
 Sadalas I, son of Cotys V (by 87–after 79 BC)
 Amadocus, Odrysian royal sent to the aid of Sulla at Chaeronea in 86 BC
 Cotys VI, son of Sadalas I (by 57–48 BC)
 Sadalas II, son of Cotys VI (48–42 BC)
 Sadalas III, kinsman of Sadalas II (42-31 BC)
 Cotys VII, son of Sadalas II by Polemocratia (31–18 BC)
 Rhescuporis II, son of Cotys VII by daughter of the Sapaean king Cotys II, killed by the Bessi (18–11 BC)
 11 BC Astaean Thrace conferred on Rhescuporis II's maternal uncle, the Sapaean king Rhoemetalces I, by the Roman emperor Augustus, thereby uniting Thrace

Family tree of Astaean kings in Thrace

See also
List of Thracian tribes

References

Ancient tribes in Thrace
Thracian tribes